"Cyberpunk" is a science fiction short story and novel written by Bruce Bethke in 1980, published November 1983 in Amazing Stories magazine, and published in novel form online. It is most famous for coining the word "cyberpunk", which came to be used to describe the media subgenre centered on rebellious use of technology under the science fiction archetype.

History
In the spring of 1980, Bethke was writing a story about children who lived immersed in a truly technological society, with their own culture, disparate from mainstream society as it appeared at that time. He describes the process as:

 The story was printed three years later in the science fiction magazine Amazing Stories, itself the first magazine to focus solely on science fiction. The story's impact was large enough, that after William Gibson's novel Neuromancer was released a year later, the term began referring to the genre it tied together as "cyberpunk", in part because of its repeated use by Gardner Dozois in print, initially in an article in The Washington Post called "Science Fiction in the Eighties."

Plot summary
Through heavy use of the literary technique of indirect exposition—known in the science fiction world as "incluing", where it originated with Robert Heinlein—the reader learns that the character "Mikey" is a proficient and troublemaking computer virtuoso, essentially a "hacker", though this term is not used in the story. He hangs out with friends who cause trouble online, encounters interference from his parents, and uses his skills to circumvent their will. In the novelized version, which incorporates a number of sequel short stories, this goes through a number of different phases.

Novel
Cyberpunk was originally written as a series of short stories in the 1980s. Bethke says "After I sold the original story in '82, I continued to work on the story cycle, publishing bits and pieces here and there throughout the 1980s. In '89 I pulled the major chunks together into the rough form of a novel, and to my surprise and delight I sold it, to a publisher who later regained his sanity and decided not to release it". This novel was purchased by a publisher via an exclusive contract that forbade Bethke to sell the novel to another publisher. However, the publisher decided not to release the novel, causing several years of legal battles over the rights to the book. Bethke has a downloadable version of the novel available for five dollars (shareware) on his website.

When asked, during a 2005 interview, by Lynne Jamneck in Strange Horizons, for the reason his publisher purchased the book but never printed it, Bethke replied that it was because he had refused to change the ending:

Bethke said that he refused because this end scene would have taken place in a school. He concluded that the book might indeed have sold better that way, but "sales aren't everything".

References

External links
 Bruce Bethke : The Etymology of "Cyberpunk"

1983 short stories
Works originally published in Amazing Stories
Cyberpunk novels